Monte Urano is a comune (municipality) in the Province of Fermo in the Italian region Marche, located about  south of Ancona and about  north of Fermo. 

Monte Urano borders the following municipalities: Fermo, Montegranaro, Sant'Elpidio a Mare, Torre San Patrizio.

Economy
Monte Urano is a   center of shoe production, ranging from man, woman to child shoes, and it is therefore the site of many footwear factories.

References

External links
 Official website

Cities and towns in the Marche